Bangladesh Black Hat Hackers aka BD Black Hats (Bengali: বাংলাদেশ ব্ল্যাক হ্যাট হ্যাকার্স) is a hacker group based in Bangladesh. It claimed in 2012 to have hacked Indian websites in retaliation for border killings by the Indian Border Security Force and the construction of the Tipaimukh Dam. Although Bangladesh Black Hat Hackers declared this cyber war, later two other Bangladesh-based hacker groups Bangladesh Cyber Army and 3xp1r3 Cyber Army also joined them.

The incident is described as a cyber war without the presence of any governmental personnel in it. The threat of the attack was given on 9 February 2012 and till 12 February 10,000 websites were claimed to have been hacked. The number rose to 20,000 later.

Around March 2015, the group also took responsibility for hacking Shashi Tharoor's website, owing to negative comments against Bangladesh's cricket win against England.

See also 
 Mr Cz4
 Anonymous (hacker group)
 LulzSec

References

External links 
 
 

Hacker groups
Bangladeshi hacker groups
Bangladesh–India relations
Cybercrime in India
2012 establishments in Bangladesh
Internet properties established in 2012